The Bunyakovsky conjecture (or Bouniakowsky conjecture) gives a criterion for a polynomial  in one variable with integer coefficients to give infinitely many prime values in the sequence  It was stated in 1857 by the Russian mathematician Viktor Bunyakovsky.

 The leading coefficient is positive,
 The polynomial is irreducible over the rationals (and integers).
 The values  have no common factor. (In particular, the coefficients of  should be relatively prime.)
 
Bunyakovsky's conjecture is that these conditions are sufficient: if  satisfies (1)–(3), then  is prime for infinitely many positive integers .

A seemingly weaker yet equivalent statement to Bunyakovsky's conjecture is that for every integer polynomial  that satisfies (1)–(3),  is prime for at least one positive integer : but then, since the translated polynomial  still satisfies (1)–(3), in view of the weaker statement  is prime for at least one positive integer , so that  is indeed prime for infinitely many positive integers . Bunyakovsky's conjecture is a special case of Schinzel's hypothesis H, one of the most famous open problems in number theory.

Discussion of three conditions
We need the first condition because if the leading coefficient is negative then  for all large , and thus  is not a (positive) prime number for large positive integers . (This merely satisfies the sign convention that primes are positive.)

We need the second condition because if  where the polynomials  and  have integer coefficients, then we have  for all integers ; but  and  take the values 0 and  only finitely many times, so  is composite for all large .

The second condition also fails for the polynomials reducible over the rationals.

This isn't a counterexample to Bunyakovsky conjecture since the condition (2) fails.

The third condition, that the numbers  have gcd 1, is obviously necessary, but is somewhat subtle, and is best understood by a counterexample. Consider , which has positive leading coefficient and is irreducible, and the coefficients are relatively prime; however  is even for all integers , and so is prime only finitely many times (namely when , in fact only at ). 

Alternatively,  can be written in the basis of binomial coefficient polynomials:

where each  is an integer, and 

For the above example, we have:

and the coefficients in the second formula have gcd 2. 

Examples

A simple quadratic polynomial
Some prime values of the polynomial  are listed in the following table. (Values of  form OEIS sequence ; those of  form .)

 
That  should be prime infinitely often is a problem first raised by Euler, and it is also the fifth Hardy–Littlewood conjecture and the fourth of Landau's problems. Despite the extensive numerical evidence    
it is not known that this sequence extends indefinitely.

Cyclotomic polynomials
The cyclotomic polynomials  for  satisfy the three conditions of Bunyakovsky's conjecture, so for all k, there should be infinitely many natural numbers n such that  is prime. It can be shown that if for all k, there exists an integer n > 1 with  prime, then for all k, there are infinitely many natural numbers n with  prime. 

The following sequence gives the smallest natural number n > 1 such that  is prime, for :

3, 2, 2, 2, 2, 2, 2, 2, 2, 2, 5, 2, 2, 2, 2, 2, 2, 6, 2, 4, 3, 2, 10, 2, 22, 2, 2, 4, 6, 2, 2, 2, 2, 2, 14, 3, 61, 2, 10, 2, 14, 2, 15, 25, 11, 2, 5, 5, 2, 6, 30, 11, 24, 7, 7, 2, 5, 7, 19, 3, 2, 2, 3, 30, 2, 9, 46, 85, 2, 3, 3, 3, 11, 16, 59, 7, 2, 2, 22, 2, 21, 61, 41, 7, 2, 2, 8, 5, 2, 2, ... .

This sequence is known to contain some large terms: the 545th term is 2706, the 601st is 2061, and the 943rd is 2042. This case of Bunyakovsky's conjecture is widely believed, but again it is not known that the sequence extends indefinitely.

 1, 2, 25, 37, 44, 68, 75, 82, 99, 115, 119, 125, 128, 159, 162, 179, 183, 188, 203, 213, 216, 229, 233, 243, 277, 289, 292, ...

Partial results: only Dirichlet's theorem
To date, the only case of Bunyakovsky's conjecture that has been proved is that of polynomials of degree 1.

No single case of Bunyakovsky's conjecture for degree greater than 1 is proved, although numerical evidence in higher degree is consistent with the conjecture.

Generalized Bunyakovsky conjecture

Note that the polynomials  do not satisfy the assumption, since one of their values must be divisible by 3 for any integer . Neither do , since one of the values must be divisible by 3 for any .  
On the other hand,  do satisfy the assumption, and the conjecture implies the polynomials have simultaneous prime values for infinitely many positive integers . 

When all the polynomials have degree 1 this is Dickson's conjecture.

In fact, this conjecture is equivalent to the Generalized Dickson conjecture.

Except for Dirichlet's theorem, no case of the conjecture has been proved, including the above cases.

See also
Integer-valued polynomial
Cohn's irreducibility criterion
Schinzel's hypothesis H
Bateman–Horn conjecture
Hardy and Littlewood's conjecture F

References

Bibliography

Conjectures about prime numbers
Unsolved problems in number theory